The Pact for Autonomy (PpA) is an autonomist political party in Friuli-Venezia Giulia that aims to defend the regional specialty and protect all linguistic minorities (Friulian, German and Slovenian).

History
The PpA was founded as association in 2015 and became a party in 2017. Its founders were local administrators of Friuli-Venezia Giulia, including Massimo Moretuzzo (mayor of Mereto di Tomba) and Markus Maurmair (mayor of Valvasone Arzene), who were soon elected as the party's secretary and president, respectively.

In the 2018 regional election the PpA, with Sergio Cecotti (former President of Friuli-Venezia Giulia and former mayor of Udine) as candidate for President, obtained 4.1% of the vote and two seats in the Regional Council.

Leadership
Secretary: Massimo Moretuzzo (2015–present)
President: Elisabetta Basso (2021–present)

References

External links
Official website

Political parties in Friuli-Venezia Giulia
European Free Alliance
Political parties established in 2015
2015 establishments in Italy
Regionalist parties in Italy